Kep1er is a South Korean girl group formed through the Mnet reality survival competition show Girls Planet 999 in 2021 and managed by Swing Entertainment and Wake One Entertainment. The group is composed of nine members: Kim Chae-hyun, Huening Bahiyyih, Choi Yu-jin, Kim Da-yeon, Seo Young-eun, Kang Ye-seo, Hikaru Ezaki, Mashiro Sakamoto, and Shen Xiaoting. They made their official debut on January 3, 2022, with the extended play (EP) First Impact.

Name

"Kep1er" was a name suggested by viewers of Girls Planet 999 through the website Naver. The name is a reference to the planets in the Kepler star systems named after the 16th century astronomer Johannes Kepler.

The name is also kept in relation to Girls Planet 999 by continuing the show's cosmic theme.

History

Formation through Girls Planet 999

Kep1er was formed through the Mnet reality survival show Girls Planet 999, which aired from August 6 to October 22, 2021. The show brought 99 contestants from China, Japan and South Korea to compete to debut in a multinational girl group. Out of initially 99 contestants, only the top nine would make the final lineup.

Before the show began, several group members had already been active in the entertainment industry. Choi Yu-jin made her debut in the Cube Entertainment girl group CLC on March 19, 2015, with the group's extended play (EP) First Love; she was on hiatus from CLC due to activities with Kep1er until their disbandment. In 2010, Kang Ye-seo was a member of the girl group CutieL before joining Busters from 2019 to 2020.

Kim Da-yeon participated in Produce 48 in 2018, representing CNC Entertainment, while Shen Xiaoting participated in Produce Camp 2020, representing Top Class Entertainment. Both were eliminated in the first round, placing 70th and 80th in their respective shows. Mashiro Sakamoto, a trainee at JYP Entertainment from 2016 to 2018, appeared in the first episode of the Mnet reality survival show Stray Kids as part of the female trainee team, but did not progress past the first episode. Following Produce 48, Da-yeon left CNC Entertainment and signed with Stardium Entertainment, only to leave once more after her debut plans fell through. Xiaoting was a competitive ballroom and modern dancer, having won a gold medal in a modern dance sport competition in Shanghai, as well as ranking sixth globally in a British competition.

2021–present: First Impact, Queendom 2, Doublast, Japanese debut, Troubleshooter, and Lovestruck!
Kep1er was originally scheduled to debut on December 14, 2021, with pre-orders for their EP First Impact having begun on November 29. They were also initially scheduled to perform at the 2021 Mnet Asian Music Awards on December 11. However, it was announced that the group's scheduled debut had been delayed to January 3, 2022, after one of their staff members tested positive for COVID-19. Their performance at the 2021 Mnet Asian Music Awards was also cancelled. On December 14, it was revealed that group members Mashiro and Xiaoting tested positive for COVID-19 and were announced to have fully recovered on December 26.

On January 3, 2022, Kep1er released their debut EP First Impact, with "Wa Da Da" serving as lead single. On January 10, 2022, Chae-hyun was announced as the new co-host for SBS MTV's music program The Show alongside Ateez's Yeosang and Cravity's Minhee. On January 13, 2022, Kep1er won their first music program award on M Countdown with "Wa Da Da". On February 21, 2022, it was confirmed that Kep1er will participate in the second season of the Mnet reality competition show Queendom, scheduled to premiere in March 2022.

On June 20, 2022, Kep1er released their second EP Doublast, with "Up!" serving as the lead single.

On August 3, 2022, Kep1er released their first Japanese single Fly-Up, featuring "Wing Wing" as lead track. It was released on September 7, 2022. 

On September 23, 2022, Kep1er released the promotional single "Sugar Rush" through Universe Music.

On October 13, 2022, Kep1er released their third EP Troubleshooter with "We Fresh" serving as the lead single.
On January 16, 2023, it was announced that Kep1er's second Japanese single Fly-By will be released on March 15, 2023, with "I Do! Do You?" as the lead track.

The group will release their fourth EP Lovestruck! on April 10, 2023.

Endorsements
On February 15, 2022, Kep1er became models for South Korean cosmetics brand S2ND.

Members

 Choi Yujin – leader
 Shen Xiaoting
 Mashiro Sakamoto – co-leader
 Kim Chaehyun
 Kim Dayeon
 Hikaru Ezaki
 Huening Bahiyyih
 Seo Youngeun
 Kang Yeseo

Discography

Extended plays

Singles

Promotional singles

Other charted songs

Videography

Music videos

Filmography

Reality shows

Awards and nominations

Notes

References

External links

 
  at Wake One Entertainment

 
Girls Planet 999
Musical groups from Seoul
2021 establishments in South Korea
Musical groups established in 2021
Singing talent show winners
South Korean girl groups
K-pop music groups
South Korean dance music groups
South Korean pop music groups
Swing Entertainment artists
Wake One Entertainment artists